Lodonga is a town in the Northern Region of Uganda. It is one of the municipalities in Yumbe District.

Location
Lodong is located along the Koboko–Yumbe–Moyo Road, approximately, by road, west of Yumbe Town, where the district headquarters are located. The geographical coordinates of Lodonga are 3°24'59.0"N, 31°06'59.0"E (Latitude:3.416389; Longitude:31.116389).

Points of interest
The following points of interest lie within the town or near the town limits: (a) the Koboko–Yumbe–Moyo Road passes through the middle of town in a general south-west to north-east direction. (b) the Basilica of the Blessed Virgin Mary, Lodonga is located in the northern part of the town.

See also
 West Nile sub-region
 List of cities and towns in Uganda

References

External links
 Yumbe District Information Portal

Populated places in Northern Region, Uganda
Yumbe District